"Zu Bethlehem geboren" is a German Christmas carol. The author was unknown until the 20th century, but research of style and content arrived at the attribution. The song was printed with a then-popular secular melody in 1638. The song appears in current Catholic and Protestant hymnals.

Melody and settings 
The melody was taken from a French chanson which was popular at the time, Une petite feste, with a frivolous text. Spee often wrote sacred texts for secular melodies, intending to fight their "pestilent poison" ("pestilenzisch Gift").

The song was printed with the melody in 1638, titled Hertzopffer (The heart's sacrifice) in the Cologne collection Geistlicher Psalter. Probably even sooner, the melody appeared with a text for Kindelwiegen, "Nun wiegen wir das Kindlein" (Now we rock the little child) in a manuscript tablature, which was written by Henricus Beginiker from 1623.

In the 19th century, the hymn became a sacred folksong. Anton Wilhelm von Zuccalmaglio used the same melody, slightly modified, for a lullaby "Die Blümelein, sie schlafen" (The little flowers, they sleep) in 1840. This version was adopted by Johannes Brahms as "Sandmännchen", No. 4 of his 15 Volkskinderlieder, WoO 31 (McCorkle), with a piano accompaniment, first printed in Winterthur by J. Rieter-Biedermann in 1858.

The song is part of current German hymnals, in the Protestant hymnal Evangelisches Gesangbuch as EG 32, and in the Catholic Gotteslob as GL 239.

Text and melody 

Zu Bethlehem geboren
ist uns ein Kindelein.
Das hab ich auserkoren,
sein eigen will ich sein.
Eia, eia, sein eigen will ich sein.

In seine Lieb versenken
will ich mich ganz hinab;
mein Herz will ich ihm schenken
und alles, was ich hab.
Eia, eia, und alles, was ich hab.

O Kindelein, von Herzen
dich will ich lieben sehr
in Freuden und in Schmerzen,
je länger mehr und mehr.
Eia, eia, je länger mehr und mehr.

Dich wahren Gott ich finde
in meinem Fleisch und Blut;
darum ich fest mich binde
an dich, mein höchstes Gut.
Eia, eia, an dich, mein höchstes Gut.

Dazu dein Gnad mir gebe,
bitt ich aus Herzensgrund,
dass dir allein ich lebe
jetzt und zu aller Stund.
Eia, eia, jetzt und zu aller Stund.

Lass mich von dir nicht scheiden,
knüpf zu, knüpf zu das Band
der Liebe zwischen beiden,
nimm hin mein Herz zum Pfand.
Eia, eia, nimm hin mein Herz zum Pfand.

See also
 List of Christmas carols

References

Further reading 
 : Das katholische deutsche Kirchenlied in seinen Singweisen. Herder, Freiburg. vol. 1, 1886, p. 416; vol. 3, 1891, p. 170; vol. 4, 1911, pp. 440 f.
 Britta Martini: "Zu Bethlehem geboren". In:  (ed.): Kirchenlied im Kirchenjahr. Fünfzig neue und alte Lieder zu den christlichen Festen (= Mainzer Hymnologische Studien. Band 8). Francke, Tübingen/Basel 2002, pp. 99–107.
 Ingeborg Weber-Kellermann: Das Buch der Weihnachtslieder. 11th ed. Schott, Mainz 2004 [1982], .

External links 
 
 "Zu Bethlehem geboren", Christian Lieder Database
 "Zu Bethlehem geboren", Tobias Widmaier (2008), analysis, versions, Historisch-kritisches Liederlexikon (in German)
 "Zu Bethlehem geboren" Liederprojekt of SWR2 and Carus-Verlag

Catholic hymns in German
German-language Christmas carols
1630s in music
17th-century hymns in German